Listeria welshimeri is a species of bacteria. It is a Gram-positive, facultatively anaerobic, motile, non-spore-forming bacillus. It is non-pathogenic and non-hemolytic. It was isolated from decayed vegetation in the United States by H. J. Welshimer, after whom the species is named. The species was first proposed in 1983.

References

External links
Type strain of Listeria welshimeri at BacDive -  the Bacterial Diversity Metadatabase

welshimeri
Bacteria described in 1983